At , Great Wood Hill, near Chedburgh, is the highest point in the English county of Suffolk. It is part of the Newmarket Ridge. The summit is in the middle of a wood, near the village of Rede.

It is the highest point in the wide area east of the River Cam.

References

Hills of Suffolk
Highest points of English counties